In enzymology, a lactaldehyde reductase is an enzyme that catalyzes the chemical reaction

(R)[or (S)]-propane-1,2-diol + NAD+  (R)[or (S)]-lactaldehyde + NADH + H+

The 3 substrates of this enzyme are (R)-propane-1,2-diol, (S)-propane-1,2-diol, and NAD+, whereas its 4 products are (R)-lactaldehyde, (S)-lactaldehyde, NADH, and H+.

This enzyme belongs to the family of oxidoreductases, specifically those acting on the CH-OH group of donor with NAD+ or NADP+ as acceptor. The systematic name of this enzyme class is (R)[or (S)]-propane-1,2-diol:NAD+ oxidoreductase. Other names in common use include propanediol:nicotinamide adenine dinucleotide (NAD+) oxidoreductase, and L-lactaldehyde:propanediol oxidoreductase. This enzyme participates in pyruvate metabolism and glyoxylate and dicarboxylate metabolism.

Structural studies

References

 

EC 1.1.1
NADH-dependent enzymes
Enzymes of known structure